Gu Zhengyi was a famed Chinese painter active during the Ming Dynasty. His birth and death years are unknown. His style name was 'Zhongfan' (仲方) and his pseudonym was Tinglin (亭林). He was a native Huating (now Songjiang, Shanghai). His style followed Huang Gongwang, and he was close with Song Xu and Sun Kehong.

References

Ming dynasty painters
Painters from Shanghai